Lurry is an old-fashioned spelling of Lorry.  Wikipedia articles include: 

 Lorry (horse-drawn)
 Amalgamated Carters, Lurrymen and Motormen's Union

See also
 Lurrie Bell